Treasure Seeker is the tenth album from jazz vocalist Gary Williams and his first as singer-songwriter. Recorded at Kenilworth Studios in 2018, all songs are co-written with Jonathan Nickoll. It was recorded with full big band and a jazz combo.

Interviewed in the Grimsby Telegraph, Williams said the album's title track was inspired by an article in the newspaper in January 1985, where a 14-year-old Williams showed off his obscure collectables and curiosities.

Nick Wakeman reviewing for Musical Theatre Review gave the album 5 stars and said, "...why did I constantly play this album on repeat for about three hours? ...it may have something to do with the silky-smooth tones of Gary Williams’ voice rendering songs I had never heard before but I am sure I will be hearing a lot more of in the near future"

Jazz critic Michael Ferber said, "This album is of outstanding excellence…"

Track listing

Personnel 
Performers
 Gary Williams – vocals
 Piano/keys – Clive Dunstall (all tracks except 1 and 7)
 Matt Regan – (tracks 1 and 7)
 Bass – Joe Pettitt (all tracks except 4, 8, 10)
 Lawrence Ungless – (tracks 4, 8, 10)
 Drums – Elliott Henshaw
 Guitar – Tommy Emmerton
 Percussion – Chris Traves
 Saxes – Graeme Blevins
 Reeds – Adrian Revell
 Flute – Mikey Davis
 Trumpet – Malcolm Melling
 Trombone – Chris Traves
 Arranger – Phil Steel
 Writers – Gary Williams and Jon Nickoll
 Recorded at Kenilworth Studios
 Producer and Studio Engineer: Chris Traves
 Executive Producer: Gary Williams

References

External links 
 Official Gary Williams web site: Treasure Seeker

2018 albums
Gary Williams (singer) albums